Rashed Khan Menon (born 18 May 1943) is a Bangladeshi politician. He is the president of Workers Party of Bangladesh and was elected as the Member of Parliament (MP) for Dhaka-8 in the 2008 general election. Menon was re-elected at the 2014 general elections. He is the chairman of the Parliamentary Standing Committee of the Ministry of Education. Earlier, he served as the Minister for Civil Aviation and Tourism.

Early life
Menon was born in Faridpur. He studied at Dhaka Collegiate School, finish in 1958. In 1960, he passed intermediate in arts group from Dhaka College. He graduated from Dhaka University in 1963 with a degree in economics. In 1964, he received his master's degree.

In the late 1960s, Menon was president of the East Pakistan Students Union faction linked to the National Awami Party of Maulana Bhasani. However, he differed with Maulana Bhasani when the latter accepted participation in elections in January 1970. Menon's East Pakistan Student Union launched a campaign against elections, stating that they would be merely a facade of democracy, that fair elections could not be held under martial law and that the situation was ripe for revolution. He built a revolutionary Maoist organisation along with Kazi Zafar Ahmed. The Menon-Zafar group built a base in Khulna (in Begerhat), amongst workers near Dacca and had a student group named Revolutionary Students Union.

Menon contested the 1973 Bangladeshi parliamentary election as a NAP (Bhasani) candidate. He did not win any seat, and afterward he complained that the Awami League government had used unfair methods to win the election.

Career

Menon was elected to parliament in 1979. In 1990, he played a leading role in the mass struggle that toppled the Hossain Mohammad Ershad regime. In 1991, he was again elected to parliament. In 1991, he, as a Workers Party of Bangladesh parliamentarian, submitted four demands for constitutional amendments in the parliament. These demands and others were submitted to a 15-member constitutional review committee, in which he was included. After 29 meetings, the committee submitted a unanimous report to the parliament.

On 17 August 1992, Menon survived a violent near-fatal attack. Unidentified assailants opened fire on the Workers Party office, injuring Menon.

Family
Menon's father, Abdul Jabbar Khan, hailed from Khudrakathi village, in Babuganj Upazila, Barisal. Menon is closely related to several prominent Bangladeshi personalities. His father was the speaker of the Pakistani National Assembly. His siblings include journalist and columnist Sadek Khan, architect Sultan M. Khan, Alan Khan, a photographer in Sydney, poet Abu Zafar Obaidullah, former minister Selima Rahman, journalist and ambassador to Burma A.Z.M. Enayetullah Khan and the publisher of New Age Shahidullah Khan Badal.

Menon is married to Lutfun Nessa Khan. She is elected as a Jatiya Sangsad member at the 11th Parliament from the reserved women's seat-48 representing the Workers Party of Bangladesh.

References

1943 births
Living people
Dhaka College alumni
Bangladeshi communists
Workers Party of Bangladesh politicians
Civil Aviation and Tourism ministers of Bangladesh
Social Welfare ministers of Bangladesh
2nd Jatiya Sangsad members
5th Jatiya Sangsad members
9th Jatiya Sangsad members
10th Jatiya Sangsad members
11th Jatiya Sangsad members